The 2007 Armenian First League season started on 25 April 2007. The last matches were played on 6 October 2007.

Overview 
 FC Bentonit Ijevan return to professional football.

League table

Top goalscorers

See also 
 2007 Armenian Premier League
 2007 Armenian Cup

External links 
 ArmFootball.com
 RSSSF: Armenia 2007 - Second Level

Armenian First League seasons
2
Armenia
Armenia